Achilus flammeus, the red fungus bug, is a planthopper native to Australia, and accidentally introduced into Auckland, New Zealand.

References

Hemiptera of Australia
Hemiptera of New Zealand
Taxa named by William Kirby (entomologist)
Insects described in 1818
Achilidae